Straightaway is an American adventure-drama television series starring Brian Kelly and John Ashley which centers around two partners in an automobile workshop who design race cars. Original episodes aired from October 6, 1961, until April 4, 1962.

Cast
Brian Kelly....Scott Ross
John Ashley....Clipper Hamilton

Synopsis

Scott Ross and Clipper Hamilton are the co-owners of the Straightaway Garage, an automobile workshop, where they design, build, and maintain race cars. Scott specializes in designing cars, while Clipper is the better mechanic. Their work involves them in the world of lovers of speed and professional auto racing, which leads to various adventures for them, often after a client brings a car to the garage.

Production

Straightaway, produced by Racer Productions, was plagued with production problems. While the series was in development, it went through three producers before finally settling on Josef Shaftel — the fourth person to take the job — as the series producer. Originally, the show was to have the title The Racers and include exciting racing sequences, and its original sponsor, the spark plug manufacturer Autolite, approved of the show's racing focus. During the summer of 1961, however, the Ford Motor Company bought Autolite. Ford wished to emphasize the safety of automobiles for family use, an image of cars obviously lacking in auto racing scenes. Before the show premiered, and at the insistence of Ford, the show was retitled Straightaway, the ten episodes that Racer Productions had already filmed before Ford became involved had to be reedited to delete their racing sequences, and later episodes had to deemphasize the show's original focus on racing.

Co-star John Ashley in real life was a rockabilly performer, and his character Clipper Hamilton occasionally sang during episodes of Straightaway. Maynard Ferguson composed the theme music for Straightaway, and his 1961 album "Straightaway" Jazz Themes contains music he composed for the television series.

Selchow and Righter produced a Straightaway-themed board game in 1961.

Broadcast history

Straightaway premiered on ABC on October 6, 1961, and for the remainder of that year aired on Fridays at 7:30 p.m. At the beginning of 1962, it moved to 8:00 p.m. on Wednesdays, where it remained for the rest of its run. CBS cancelled it after only one season, and its last original episode aired on April 4, 1962.

After the show ended, ABC broadcast prime-time reruns of Straightaway during its normal Wednesday time slot, beginning on April 11, 1962, a week after the last new episode aired. The last prime-time rerun aired on July 4, 1962.

Episodes
Sources

References

External links
 Straightaway opening credits on YouTube
 John Ashley singing scene from Straightaway on YouTube
 Straightaway theme music by Maynard Ferguson on YouTube

American Broadcasting Company original programming
1960s American drama television series
American adventure drama television series
1961 American television series debuts
1962 American television series endings
Television shows set in the United States